KCSR (610 AM) is a radio station broadcasting a country music format. Licensed to Chadron, Nebraska, United States. The station is currently owned by Chadrad Communications, Inc. and features programming from CBS Radio, Motor Racing Network and Westwood One.

References

External links

Country radio stations in the United States
CSR
Chadron, Nebraska
Radio stations established in 1954
1954 establishments in Nebraska